Soldadu (U) Mohammad Shafie bin Haji Mohammad Efenddy (born 4 August 1995) is a Bruneian international footballer who plays for MS ABDB of the Brunei Super League and the Brunei national football team. He is adept at playing on either flank or as a striker.

Club career
Shafie started his club career with the Brunei Youth Team in 2011, playing in the Brunei Premier League II. He then laced up for IKLS FC in the 2014 Brunei Premier League. The following year, he played for Tabuan Muda, a league team that was formed by the NFABD to prepare for international competitions. They finished fifth in the 2015 and 2016 seasons of the Brunei Super League.

Shafie moved to Indera SC in 2017. He scored his first two goals for Indera on 10 September against Menglait FC which finished 4–0. On 26 September, Shafie scored a hattrick in a 6–0 victory over Najip I-Team. He contributed a total of 11 goals for Indera who finished third in the league.

Shafie signed for professional club DPMM FC of the Singapore Premier League on 13 February 2018. He made his debut on 24 May in a 1–1 draw against Young Lions as a 77th-minute substitute, providing the assist for Adi Said's equalising goal three minutes from time.

Shafie finished the 2018 Singapore Premier League with 11 appearances under Renê Weber, but struggled to even make the bench under Adrian Pennock who prefers wing-backs supplying a front two and bringing on Razimie Ramlli as a super-sub role. At the second half of the season, Shafie made way for Hakeme Yazid Said in the DPMM squad.

At the start of the 2020 Brunei Super League, Shafie signed with defending champions MS ABDB, which coincided with his drafting into the Royal Brunei Air Force. However he transferred to DPMM FC II at the behest of ex-ABDB coach Rosmin Kamis who was put in charge of the team shortly after the Piala Sumbangsih loss to Kota Ranger FC on 8 February.

International career
Shafie has been playing exclusively with the national team setup ever since graduating from Brunei's Sports School. He was a member of the Brunei under-21 side that was triumphant on home soil at the 2012 Hassanal Bolkiah Trophy, starting three games out of six.

A year later, Shafie travelled to Thailand with the Brunei under-19s for the 2014 AFC U-19 Championship qualification, where they lost all three games. A similar story happened with the under-23s at the 27th SEA Games football tournament in Myanmar two months later, where Shafie only played twice.

Shafie missed out on the 2014 Hassanal Bolkiah Trophy but returned with the under-23s for the 2016 AFC U-23 Championship qualification held in Indonesia in late March 2015. Scoreless and goalless, the same team headed for the 28th SEA Games. Shafie was ever-present although the Young Wasps lost all five of their games.

Shafie made his full international debut on 3 November 2015 versus Cambodia in a friendly match that finished 6-1 against Brunei. He was selected for the 2016 AFF Suzuki Cup qualification matches held in Cambodia in October. He started the first game against Timor-Leste and scored the winner in a 2–1 victory.

In July 2017, Shafie captained the under-23s for the 2018 AFC U-23 Championship qualification that took place in Yangon, Myanmar. The Young Wasps lost all three games. The same story happened at the 29th SEA Games held in Malaysia a month later, where ever-present Shafie and compatriots suffered four defeats out of four.

Shafie was selected for the national team's 2018 AFF Suzuki Cup qualification matches against Timor-Leste in early September. He played the first 45 minutes in a 3–1 defeat away from home in the first leg in Kuala Lumpur. Brunei were knocked out 2–3 on aggregate.

Despite yet to make an appearance in the 2019 season for DPMM, Shafie was in contention for a place in the national squad to face Mongolia at the 2022 World Cup qualification matches in July. However he pulled out of the two-legged tie due to unspecified reasons.

In December 2022, he was selected for the national team in the 2022 AFF Mitsubishi Electric Cup and featured against Indonesia in Kuala Lumpur in a 0–7 loss.

International goals

Honours

Team
Brunei national under-21 football team
Hassanal Bolkiah Trophy: 2012

Individual
 
  Meritorius Service Medal (PJK) (2012)

References

External links

1995 births
Living people
Bruneian military personnel
Association football forwards
Bruneian footballers
Brunei international footballers
DPMM FC players
Indera SC players
Competitors at the 2013 Southeast Asian Games
Competitors at the 2015 Southeast Asian Games
Competitors at the 2017 Southeast Asian Games
Southeast Asian Games competitors for Brunei